Bae Jun-seo (born 2000) is a South Korean taekwondo practitioner. He won the gold medal at the 2019 World Taekwondo Championships in the men's 54 kg event.

References 

Living people
South Korean male taekwondo practitioners
2000 births
World Taekwondo Championships medalists
21st-century South Korean people